The Dart Reefs is a group of reefs in the central area of the Ward Hunt Strait in Milne Bay Province of southeastern Papua New Guinea.

The reefs are ribbon-like structured patch reefs.

They are located approximately 15 km from New Guinea island, and the same distance from Goodenough Island of the D'Entrecasteaux Islands archipelago.

See also

References

Islands of Milne Bay Province
Reefs of Papua New Guinea
D'Entrecasteaux Islands